Vihtori Urvikko (29 April 1889 – 2 April 1961) was a Finnish wrestler. He competed in the lightweight event at the 1912 Summer Olympics.

References

External links
 

1889 births
1961 deaths
Olympic wrestlers of Finland
Wrestlers at the 1912 Summer Olympics
Finnish male sport wrestlers
People from Urjala
Sportspeople from Pirkanmaa